Yevgeni Robertovich Shpedt (born 26 January 1986) is a Russian former professional footballer.

Club career
He made his debut in the Russian Premier League in 2006 for FC Spartak Moscow.

Honours
 Russian Premier League runner-up: 2006.
 Russian Cup finalist: 2006.

References

1986 births
Living people
Russian footballers
FC Spartak Moscow players
FC KAMAZ Naberezhnye Chelny players
Russian Premier League players
FC Khimki players
FC Nizhny Novgorod (2007) players
FC Chernomorets Novorossiysk players
FC Gornyak Uchaly players
FC Dynamo Barnaul players
Association football defenders
FC Novokuznetsk players